The Slovak Chess Championship is the chess competition, which determines the best slovak chess player.

History 
1993 - today - championships of Slovakia 
for Czechoslovak championship see Czechoslovak Chess Championship

Men's winners

In Slovakia, part of Czechoslovakia

{| class="sortable wikitable"
! # !! Year !! City !! Winner
|-
| 01  || 1955 || Starý Smokovec || Ján Šefc
|-
| 02  || 1975 || Hlohovec || Ján Plachetka
|-
| 03  || 1977 || Detva || Ľubomír Ftáčnik
|-
| 04  || 1978 || Prešov || Jozef Franzen
|-
| 05  || 1979 || Dolný Kubín || Ľubomír Ftáčnik
|-
| 06  || 1981 || Bardejov || Ladislav Dobrovolský
|-
| 07  || 1983 || Nová Baňa || Róbert Tibenský
|-
| 08  || 1984 || Čadca || Igor Štohl
|-
| 09  || 1985 || Piešťany || Ján Baňas
|-
| 10  || 1986 || Bratislava || Igor Gažík
|-
| 11  || 1987 || Šaľa || Róbert Tibenský
|-
| 12  || 1988 || Trnava || Peter Petrán
|-
| 13  || 1989 || Michalovce || Martin Mrva
|-
| 14  || 1991 || Trenčín || Ivan Novák
|-
|}

In independent Slovakia

{| class="sortable wikitable"
! # !! Year !! City !! Winner
|-
| 01  || 1993 || Topoľčianky || Ján Plachetka
|-
| 02  || 1994 || Topoľčianky|| Róbert Tibenský
|-
| 03  || 1995 || Trenčín || Róbert Tibenský
|-
| 04  || 1996 || Martin || Róbert Tibenský
|-
| 05  || 1997 || Prešov || Ladislav Salai
|-
| 06  || 1998 || Prievidza || Tomáš Balogh
|-
| 07  || 1999 || Nové Zámky || Ján Baňas
|-
| 08  || 2000 || Zvolen || Ján Markoš
|-
| 09  || 2001 || Prešov || Vítězslav Priehoda
|-
| 10  || 2002 || Galanta - Kaskády|| Sergei Movsesian
|-
| 11  || 2003 || Tatranské Zruby || Mikuláš Maník
|-
| 12  || 2004 || Zemplínska Šírava || Eduard Hagara
|-
| 13  || 2005 || Trenčianske Teplice || Tomáš Petrík
|-
| 14  || 2006 || Banská Štiavnica || Tomáš Petrík
|-
| 15  || 2007 || Banská Štiavnica || Sergei Movsesian
|-
| 16  || 2008 || Zvolen || Peter Vavrák
|-
| 17  || 2009 || Tatranské Zruby || Martin Mrva
|-
| 18  || 2010 || Banská Štiavnica || Marián Jurčík
|-
| 19  || 2011 || Banská Štiavnica || Ján Markoš
|-
| 20  || 2012 || Banská Štiavnica || Ján Markoš
|-
| 21  || 2013 || Banská Štiavnica || Peter Michalik
|-
| 22  || 2014 || Prievidza || Peter Michalik
|-
| 23  || 2015 || Banská Štiavnica || Peter Michalik
|-
| 24  || 2016 || Banská Štiavnica || Milan Pacher
|-
| 25  || 2017 || Banská Štiavnica || Christopher Repka
|-
| 26  || 2018 || Banská Štiavnica || Christopher Repka
|}

Women's winners

{| class="sortable wikitable"
! # !! Year !! City !! Winner
|-
| 01 || 1991 || Trencin || Ivana Sedlakova
|-
| 02 || 1993 || Topoľčianky || Jarmila Kačincová
|-
| 03 || 1994 || Martin || Andrea Ciganikova
|-
| 04 || 1996 || Ziar nad Hronom || Mirjana Medic
|-
| 11  || 2003 || Tatranské Zruby || Eva Repková
|-
| 16  || 2008 || Zvolen || Mária Machalová
|-
| 17  || 2009 || Tatranské Zruby || Regina Pokorná
|-
| 18  || 2010 || Banská Štiavnica || Eva Repková
|-
| 19  || 2011 || Banská Štiavnica || Julia Kochetkova
|-
| 20  || 2012 || Banská Štiavnica || Julia Kochetkova
|-
| 21  || 2013 || Banská Štiavnica || Eva Repková
|-
| 22  || 2014 ||  || Zuzana Borošová
|-
| 23  || 2015 ||  || Monika Motyčáková
|}

References

Chess national championships
Women's chess national championships
Championship